Newtown-Erskine was an electoral district of the Legislative Assembly in the Australian state of New South Wales, created in 1894 with the division of the multi-member district of Newtown and named after the inner Sydney suburb of Erskineville or George Erskine, a Wesleyan minister, after whom it was named. Along with Newtown-St Peters, it was partly replaced by a recreated Newtown in 1904.

Members for Newtown-Erskine

Election results

References

Former electoral districts of New South Wales
1894 establishments in Australia
Constituencies established in 1894
1904 disestablishments in Australia
Constituencies disestablished in 1904